Culex (Culex) gelidus is a species of mosquito belonging to the genus Culex. It is found in India, Sri Lanka, Bangladesh, Cambodia, China, Hong Kong, India, Indonesia, Japan, Laos, Malaysia, Myanmar, Nepal, New Guinea (Island); Papua New Guinea, Pakistan, Philippines,  Taiwan, Thailand, Vietnam. In 1976, it was identified as a major vector of Japanese encephalitis virus, in India. From an experiment, it was evident that aqueous solution of Calotropis gigantea leaves possess larvicidal activity, mosquito repellent activity and ovicidal activity against Culex gelidus.

References

External links 
Breeding patterns of the JE vector Culex gelidus and its insect predators in rice cultivation areas of northern peninsular Malaysia.
Detection of the exotic mosquito Culex gelidus in the Northern Territory
Potential distribution of the Asian disease vector Culex gelidus Theobald (Diptera: Culicidae) in Australia and New Zealand: a prediction based on climate suitability
Experimental infection of culex annulirostris, culex gelidus, and aedes vigilax

gelidus